Svir is a town in the Minsk Region of Belarus. In 2021 it had a population of ~1000 residents.

History

It is believed to have been founded in the 13th century by Lithuanian Duke Daumantas and was part of the Grand Duchy of Lithuania until 1795.

The mound in the town has remains of fortifications from the 14th-16th centuries.

In the 18th-19th centuries, the Lithuanians in Svir and its vicinities were Slavicized.

Gallery

References

Populated places in Minsk Region
Towns in Belarus
Myadzyel District
Vilnius Voivodeship